Philodromus marxi, the metallic crab spider, is a species of running crab spider in the family Philodromidae. It is found in the United States.  They are a sexually dimorphic species.  The males are smooth with a metallic sheen and the females present as bristly white and grey.

References

External links

 

marxi
Articles created by Qbugbot
Spiders described in 1884